The Battle of Andros was an obscure naval battle during the Third Syrian War. Despite its numerical superiority, the Egyptian fleet, probably commanded by Sophron of Ephesus, lost to a Macedonian fleet led by Antigonus II Gonatas. The Egyptian captain Ptolemy Andromachou, an illegitimate half-brother of the Pharaoh, lost his ship and crew, barely escaping to Ephesus.

The date of the battle is uncertain, but generally the year 246/245 BC is accepted. Following the battle, the Egyptian king Ptolemy III Euergetes lost the dominion of the Nesiotic League to Antigonus Gonatas.

See also
Ptolemaic Egypt
Seleucid Empire
Syrian Wars

References

Andros
Ancient Andros
Andros
Andros (246 BC)
Andros
3rd century BC in Greece